Pantoporia aurelia, the baby lascar, is a species of nymphalid butterfly found in Asia.

Subspecies
Pantoporia aurelia aurelia (Peninsular Malaya, Sumatra, Batu, Borneo)
Pantoporia aurelia boma Eliot, 1969 (southern Sumatra to Peninsular Thailand)

References

Pantoporia
Butterflies of Borneo
Butterflies of Indochina
Butterflies described in 1886